Sphingomonas yunnanensis is a species of bacteria. Its cells are short-rod-shaped and motile. Its type strain is YIM 003T (=CCTCC AB 204064T=KCTC 12346T).

References

External links

Type strain of Sphingomonas yunnanensis at BacDive -  the Bacterial Diversity Metadatabase

yunnanensis
Bacteria described in 2005